The Social Democrats, officially Social Democracy (SD),  is a social-democratic political party in Italy founded on 2 July 2022. It considers itself to be the continuation of the historical Italian Democratic Socialist Party (PSDI), founded by Giuseppe Saragat and other reformist socialists on 11 January 1947.

Background
In 2001, Domenico "Mimmo" Magistro, one of the leading members of Social Democracy (SD), was the founder of another social democratic party, named The Social Democrats – Federalists for the Euromediterranean (i Socialdemocratici – Federalisti per l'Euromediterraneo, iSD) and active above all in Apulia. The iSD was founded after Magistro, secretary of the 2004 refounded Italian Democratic Socialist Party from 2007 to July 2011, was replaced with Renato D'Andria by a tribunal in Rome as the legitimate national secretary of the party. Magistro proposed a reconciliation between the two factions; D'Andria did not accept the conditions posed by him. In mid-November 2011, 28 members out of 31 of the outgoing National Council, including Magistro, left the PSDI in order to form iSD.

History
On 2 July 2022, the first national conference of the party took place, 75 years after the split of Palazzo Barberini, from the name of a palace in Rome where the foundation of the PSDI took place. In the national conference, Umberto Costi was appointed national secretary of the party, while Magistro, became honorary chairman.

In addition to several former activists from PSDI, the new party was joined by Antonio Matasso, leader of the Sicilian Socialist Party, which became the regional secretary of the party in Sicily. The members of the iSD come mostly from the PSDI but also from the Italian Socialist Party and the libertarian factions of the Italian Socialist Party of Proletarian Unity.

The party, which initially wanted to contest the 2022 Italian general election in a centre-left coalition enlarged to include the centrist parties, favours the autonomy of the regional sections and aims to promote a new Socialist Constituent. In the run-up of the 2022 general election, the party joined forces with Italia Viva and Carlo Calenda's Action, aiming to represent the left-wing of the Third Pole.

Ideology
The party adheres to the ideas of democratic socialism, liberal socialism, and social democracy. As a supporter of internationalism and pro-Europeanism, the party is committed to maintaining Italy in the geopolitical cadre of advanced liberal democracies.

Leadership
Secretary: Umberto Costi (2022–present)

References

External links
Official website

2011 establishments in Italy
Social democratic parties in Italy
Political parties established in 2011
Pro-European political parties in Italy